Pro Baseball: Family Stadium, released as  in Japan and R.B.I. Baseball in North America, is a 1986 baseball video game originally developed and published by Namco for the Family Computer (Famicom). In North America, it was published by Tengen for arcade and Nintendo Entertainment System platforms as R.B.I. Baseball. It is the first game in the Family Stadium and R.B.I. Baseball franchises. The game was a critical and commercial success in Japan and North America.

Development
Pro Baseball: Family Stadium was created by Namco programmer Yoshihiro Kishimoto, who had previously worked on games such as Baraduke (1985). The planner for Toy Pop, Takefumi Hyodoh, had transferred from a different section of the company — as his first time being a planner, Hyodoh was rather slow, which left Kishimoto with plenty of free time. For a short while he spent most of his time playing Nintendo's Baseball for the Famicom with some of his colleagues, where during play they would bring up how certain parts of the game could be fixed or improved, notably the lack of names or abilities for the in-game players. Kishimoto also expressed disappointment towards the game's lack of playable defense. Once development of Toy Pop was completed, Kishimoto decided to try making a baseball game of his own.

The project was made for the Family Computer due to the system's massive success in Japan and for Namco's console and arcade operations being part of the same division, allowing Kishimoto to easily begin development of the game in his section of the company. After asking his supervisor about what work he was assigned to next, he was instead told he could make whatever type of game he wanted, due to a lack of work needed by him for the time being. Family Stadium was Kishomoto's first experience with developing a game for the Famicom and with assembly code. It was also Namco's first baseball video game, as prior to the game's release they had released several baseball-themed mechanical arcade games, such as Pitch In (1979) and Batting Chance (1981).

Release

Pro Baseball: Family Stadium was released in Japan on December 10, 1986. Atari Games released the game for arcades in North America in September 1987, renamed Vs. Atari R.B.I. Baseball for the Nintendo Vs. System arcade unit. This version was later released for the Nintendo Entertainment System by Tengen as simply R.B.I. Baseball, being one of the company's only three officially licensed games released for the console.

Atari programmer Peter Lipson adapted Family Stadium into the American localized version R.B.I. Baseball for the NES, which was published by Atari Games subsidiary Tengen.

R.B.I Baseball became the first console game of its kind to be licensed by the Major League Baseball Players Association (MLBPA) and used actual MLB player names, unlike other baseball video games of the late 1980s. As it was not licensed by Major League Baseball (MLB) itself, it did not use team nicknames or logos. The game also boasted two All-Star teams, American League and National League; the two featured established veterans such as George Brett, Mike Schmidt, Dale Murphy and Andre Dawson—none of whom appeared on the other eight teams—and up-and-coming players like Mark McGwire, Andrés Galarraga, Kevin Seitzer and José Canseco.

Reception

Upon release, Pro Baseball: Family Stadium was met with critical acclaim by critics. It received a Famitsu score of 35 out of 40, making it one of the oldest games in the Famitsu Platinum Hall of Fame (at least 35 out of 40). Reviewers applauded its gameplay and sense of realism, as well as its usage of giving each of the players actual names and abilities. In the first Famitsu Best Hit Game Awards published in February 1987, the game received the award for Best Sports Game.

It was also a commercial success. In Japan, it topped the Famitsu sales charts in January 1987, and sold  copies by 1990. It went on to sell over  copies, making it one of the best-selling Famicom games of all time. In the second Famitsu Best Hit Game Awards published in February 1988, the game received the "Long Seller" award. In the United States, R.B.I. Baseball topped the sales charts in August 1988.

Notes

References

1986 video games
Baseball video games
Namco games
Nintendo Entertainment System games
Nintendo Vs. Series games
Video games developed in Japan
Multiplayer and single-player video games